The Los Angeles Times, abbreviated as LA Times, is a daily newspaper that started publishing in Los Angeles in 1881. Based in the Los Angeles suburb of El Segundo since 2018,  it is the sixth-largest newspaper by circulation in the United States. The publication has won more than 40 Pulitzer Prizes. It is owned by Patrick Soon-Shiong and published by the Times Mirror Company. The newspaper's coverage has evolved more recently away from U.S. and international headlines and toward emphasizing California and especially Southern California stories.

In the 19th century, the paper developed a reputation for civic boosterism and opposition to labor unions, the latter of which led to the bombing of its headquarters in 1910. The paper's profile grew substantially in the 1960s under publisher Otis Chandler, who adopted a more national focus. In recent decades, the paper's readership has declined, and it has been beset by a series of ownership changes, staff reductions, and other controversies. In January 2018, the paper's staff voted to unionize and finalized their first union contract on October 16, 2019. The paper moved out of its historic downtown headquarters to a facility in El Segundo, near Los Angeles International Airport in July 2018.

History

Otis era
The Times was first published on December 4, 1881, as the Los Angeles Daily Times, under the direction of Nathan Cole Jr. and Thomas Gardiner. It was first printed at the Mirror printing plant, owned by Jesse Yarnell and T. J. Caystile. Unable to pay the printing bill, Cole and Gardiner turned the paper over to the Mirror Company. In the meantime, S. J. Mathes had joined the firm, and it was at his insistence that the Times continued publication. In July 1882, Harrison Gray Otis moved from Santa Barbara, California to become the paper's editor. Otis made the Times a financial success.

Historian Kevin Starr wrote that Otis was a businessman "capable of manipulating the entire apparatus of politics and public opinion for his own enrichment". Otis's editorial policy was based on civic boosterism, extolling the virtues of Los Angeles and promoting its growth. Toward those ends, the paper supported efforts to expand the city's water supply by acquiring the rights to the water supply of the distant Owens Valley.

The efforts of the Times to fight local unions led to the bombing of its headquarters on October 1, 1910, killing twenty-one people. Two union leaders, James and Joseph McNamara, were charged. The American Federation of Labor hired noted trial attorney Clarence Darrow to represent the brothers, who eventually pleaded guilty.

Otis fastened a bronze eagle on top of a high frieze of the new Times headquarters building designed by Gordon Kaufmann, proclaiming anew the credo written by his wife, Eliza: "Stand Fast, Stand Firm, Stand Sure, Stand True".

Chandler era
After Otis's death in 1917, his son-in-law, Harry Chandler, took control as publisher of the Times. Harry Chandler was succeeded in 1944 by his son, Norman Chandler, who ran the paper during the rapid growth of post-war Los Angeles. Norman's wife, Dorothy Buffum Chandler, became active in civic affairs and led the effort to build the Los Angeles Music Center, whose main concert hall was named the Dorothy Chandler Pavilion in her honor. Family members are buried at the Hollywood Forever Cemetery near Paramount Studios. The site also includes a memorial to the Times Building bombing victims.

In 1935, the newspaper moved to a new, landmark Art Deco building, the Los Angeles Times Building, to which the newspaper would add other facilities until taking up the entire city block between Spring, Broadway, First and Second streets, which came to be known as Times Mirror Square and would house the paper until 2018. Harry Chandler, then the president and general manager of Times-Mirror Co., declared the Los Angeles Times Building a "monument to the progress of our city and Southern California".

The fourth generation of family publishers, Otis Chandler, held that position from 1960 to 1980. Otis Chandler sought legitimacy and recognition for his family's paper, often forgotten in the power centers of the Northeastern United States due to its geographic and cultural distance. He sought to remake the paper in the model of the nation's most respected newspapers, such as The New York Times and The Washington Post. Believing that the newsroom was "the heartbeat of the business", Otis Chandler increased the size and pay of the reporting staff and expanded its national and international reporting. In 1962, the paper joined with The Washington Post to form the Los Angeles Times–Washington Post News Service to syndicate articles from both papers for other news organizations. He also toned down the unyielding conservatism that had characterized the paper over the years, adopting a much more centrist editorial stance.

During the 1960s, the paper won four Pulitzer Prizes, more than its previous nine decades combined.

Writing in 2013 about the pattern of newspaper ownership by founding families, Times reporter Michael Hiltzik said that:

The first generations bought or founded their local paper for profits and also social and political influence (which often brought more profits). Their children enjoyed both profits and influence, but as the families grew larger, the later generations found that only one or two branches got the power, and everyone else got a share of the money. Eventually the coupon-clipping branches realized that they could make more money investing in something other than newspapers. Under their pressure the companies went public, or split apart, or disappeared. That's the pattern followed over more than a century by the Los Angeles Times under the Chandler family.

The paper's early history and subsequent transformation was chronicled in an unauthorized history, Thinking Big (1977), and was one of four organizations profiled by David Halberstam in The Powers That Be (1979, ; 2000 reprint ). It has also been the whole or partial subject of nearly thirty dissertations in communications or social science in the past four decades.

Former Times buildings

1881–1886, Temple and New High streets in the old central business district
1886–1910, northeast corner First and Broadway, old central business district, destroyed in a bombing in 1910
1912–1935, northeast corner First and Broadway, rebuilt as a four-story building with "castle-like" clock tower, opened 1912
1935–2018, Times Mirror Square, the block bounded by First, Second, Spring streets and Broadway, Downtown Los Angeles
2018–present, El Segundo, California

Modern era

The Los Angeles Times was beset in the first decade of the 21st century by a change in ownership, a bankruptcy, a rapid succession of editors, reductions in staff, decreases in paid circulation, the need to increase its Web presence, and a series of controversies.

The newspaper moved to a new headquarters building in El Segundo, near Los Angeles International Airport, in July 2018.

Ownership
In 2000, Times Mirror Company, publisher of the Los Angeles Times, was purchased by the Tribune Company of Chicago, Illinois, placing the paper in co-ownership with the then WB-affiliated (now CW-affiliated) KTLA, which Tribune acquired in 1985.

On April 2, 2007, the Tribune Company announced its acceptance of real estate entrepreneur Sam Zell's offer to buy the Chicago Tribune,  the Los Angeles Times, and all other company assets. Zell announced that he would sell the Chicago Cubs baseball club. He put up for sale the company's 25 percent interest in Comcast SportsNet Chicago. Until shareholder approval was received, Los Angeles billionaires Ron Burkle and Eli Broad had the right to submit a higher bid, in which case Zell would have received a $25 million buyout fee.

In December 2008, the Tribune Company filed for bankruptcy protection. The bankruptcy was a result of declining advertising revenue and a debt load of $12.9 billion, much of it incurred when the paper was taken private by Zell.

On February 7, 2018, Tribune Publishing (formerly Tronc Inc.), agreed to sell the Los Angeles Times along with other southern California properties (The San Diego Union-Tribune, Hoy) to billionaire biotech investor Patrick Soon-Shiong. This purchase by Soon-Shiong through his Nant Capital investment fund was for $500 million, as well as the assumption of $90 million in pension liabilities. The sale to Soon-Shiong closed on June 16, 2018.

Editorial changes and staff reductions
In 2000, John Carroll, former editor of the Baltimore Sun, was brought in to restore the luster of the newspaper. During his reign at the Times, he eliminated more than 200 jobs, but despite an operating profit margin of 20 percent, the Tribune executives were unsatisfied with returns, and by 2005 Carroll had left the newspaper. His successor, Dean Baquet, refused to impose the additional cutbacks mandated by the Tribune Company.

Baquet was the first African-American to hold this type of editorial position at a top-tier daily. During Baquet and Carroll's time at the paper, it won 13 Pulitzer Prizes, more than any other paper except The New York Times. However, Baquet was removed from the editorship for not meeting the demands of the Tribune Group—as was publisher Jeffrey Johnson—and was replaced by James O'Shea of the Chicago Tribune. O'Shea himself left in January 2008 after a budget dispute with publisher David Hiller.

The paper's content and design style were overhauled several times in attempts to increase circulation. In 2000, a major change reorganized the news sections (related news was put closer together) and changed the "Local" section to the "California" section with more extensive coverage. Another major change in 2005 saw the Sunday "Opinion" section retitled the Sunday "Current" section, with a radical change in its presentation and featured columnists. There were regular cross-promotions with Tribune-owned television station KTLA to bring evening-news viewers into the Times fold.

The paper reported on July 3, 2008, that it planned to cut 250 jobs by Labor Day and reduce the number of published pages by 15 percent. That included about 17 percent of the news staff, as part of the newly private media company's mandate to reduce costs. "We've tried to get ahead of all the change that's occurring in the business and get to an organization and size that will be sustainable", Hiller said. In January 2009, the Times eliminated the separate California/Metro section, folding it into the front section of the newspaper. The Times also announced seventy job cuts in news and editorial or a 10 percent cut in payroll.

In September 2015, Austin Beutner, the publisher and chief executive, was replaced by Timothy E. Ryan. On October 5, 2015, the Poynter Institute reported that "At least 50' editorial positions will be culled from the Los Angeles Times" through a buyout. On this subject, the Los Angeles Times reported with foresight: "For the 'funemployed,' unemployment is welcome." Nancy Cleeland, who took O'Shea's buyout offer, did so because of "frustration with the paper's coverage of working people and organized labor" (the beat that earned her Pulitzer). She speculated that the paper's revenue shortfall could be reversed by expanding coverage of economic justice topics, which she believed were increasingly relevant to Southern California; she cited the paper's attempted hiring of a "celebrity justice reporter" as an example of the wrong approach.

On August 21, 2017, Ross Levinsohn, then aged 54, was named publisher and CEO, replacing Davan Maharaj, who had been both publisher and editor. On June 16, 2018, the same day the sale to Patrick Soon-Shiong closed, Norman Pearlstine was named executive editor.

On May 3, 2021, the newspaper announced that it had selected Kevin Merida to be the new executive editor. Merida is a senior vice president at ESPN and leads The Undefeated, a site focused on sports, race, and culture. Previously, he was the first Black managing editor at The Washington Post.

Circulation
The Times has suffered continued decline in distribution. Reasons offered for the circulation drop included a price increase and a rise in the proportion of readers preferring to read the online version instead of the print version. Editor Jim O'Shea, in an internal memo announcing a May 2007, mostly voluntary, reduction in force, characterized the decrease in circulation as an "industry-wide problem" which the paper had to counter by "growing rapidly on-line", "break[ing] news on the Web and explain[ing] and analyz[ing] it in our newspaper."

The Times closed its San Fernando Valley printing plant in early 2006, leaving press operations to the Olympic plant and to Orange County. Also that year the paper announced its circulation had fallen to 851,532, down 5.4 percent from 2005. The Timess loss of circulation was the largest of the top ten newspapers in the U.S. Some observers believed that the drop was due to the retirement of circulation director Bert Tiffany. Still, others thought the decline was a side effect of a succession of short-lived editors who were appointed by publisher Mark Willes after publisher Otis Chandler relinquished day-to-day control in 1995. Willes, the former president of General Mills, was criticized for his lack of understanding of the newspaper business, and was derisively referred to by reporters and editors as The Cereal Killer. 

The Timess reported daily circulation in October 2010 was 600,449, down from a peak of 1,225,189 daily and 1,514,096 Sunday in April 1990.

Internet presence and free weeklies 

In December 2006, a team of Times reporters delivered management with a critique of the paper's online news efforts known as the Spring Street Project. The report, which condemned the Times as a "web-stupid" organization, was followed by a shakeup in management of the paper's website, www.latimes.com, and a rebuke of print staffers who were described as treating "change as a threat."

On July 10, 2007, Times launched a local Metromix site targeting live entertainment for young adults. A free weekly tabloid print edition of Metromix Los Angeles followed in February 2008; the publication was the newspaper's first stand-alone print weekly. In 2009, the Times shut down Metromix and replaced it with Brand X, a blog site and free weekly tabloid targeting young, social networking readers. Brand X launched in March 2009; the Brand X tabloid ceased publication in June 2011 and the website was shut down the following month.

In May 2018, the Times blocked access to its online edition from most of Europe because of the European Union's General Data Protection Regulation.

Other controversies
It was revealed in 1999 that a revenue-sharing arrangement was in place between the Times and Staples Center in the preparation of a 168-page magazine about the opening of the sports arena. The magazine's editors and writers were not informed of the agreement, which breached the Chinese wall that traditionally has separated advertising from journalistic functions at American newspapers. Publisher Mark Willes also had not prevented advertisers from pressuring reporters in other sections of the newspaper to write stories favorable to their point of view.
Michael Kinsley was hired as the Opinion and Editorial (op-ed) Editor in April 2004 to help improve the quality of the opinion pieces. His role was controversial, for he forced writers to take a more decisive stance on issues. In 2005, he created a Wikitorial, the first Wiki by a major news organization. Although it failed, readers could combine forces to produce their own editorial pieces. It was shut down after being besieged with inappropriate material. He resigned later that year.

The Times drew fire for a last-minute story before the 2003 California recall election alleging that gubernatorial candidate Arnold Schwarzenegger groped scores of women during his movie career. Columnist Jill Stewart wrote on the American Reporter website that the Times did not do a story on allegations that former Governor Gray Davis had verbally and physically abused women in his office, and that the Schwarzenegger story relied on a number of anonymous sources. Further, she said, four of the six alleged victims were not named. She also said that in the case of the Davis allegations, the Times decided against printing the Davis story because of its reliance on anonymous sources. The American Society of Newspaper Editors said that the Times lost more than 10,000 subscribers because of the negative publicity surrounding the Schwarzenegger article.

On November 12, 2005, new op-ed editor Andrés Martinez announced the dismissal of liberal op-ed columnist Robert Scheer and conservative editorial cartoonist Michael Ramirez.

The Times also came under controversy for its decision to drop the weekday edition of the Garfield comic strip in 2005, in favor of a hipper comic strip Brevity, while retaining it in the Sunday edition. Garfield was dropped altogether shortly thereafter.

Following the Republican Party's defeat in the 2006 mid-term elections, an Opinion piece by Joshua Muravchik, a leading neoconservative and a resident scholar at the conservative American Enterprise Institute, published on November 19, 2006, was titled 'Bomb Iran'. The article shocked some readers, with its hawkish comments in support of more unilateral action by the United States, this time against Iran.

On March 22, 2007, editorial page editor Andrés Martinez resigned following an alleged scandal centering on his girlfriend's professional relationship with a Hollywood producer who had been asked to guest-edit a section in the newspaper. In an open letter written upon leaving the paper, Martinez criticized the publication for allowing the Chinese wall between the news and editorial departments to be weakened, accusing news staffers of lobbying the opinion desk.

In November 2017, Walt Disney Studios blacklisted the Times from attending press screenings of its films, in retaliation for September 2017 reportage by the paper on Disney's political influence in the Anaheim area. The company considered the coverage to be "biased and inaccurate". As a sign of condemnation and solidarity, a number of major publications and writers, including The New York Times,  Boston Globe critic Ty Burr, Washington Post blogger Alyssa Rosenberg, and the websites The A.V. Club and Flavorwire, announced that they would boycott press screenings of future Disney films. The National Society of Film Critics, Los Angeles Film Critics Association, New York Film Critics Circle, and Boston Society of Film Critics jointly announced that Disney's films would be ineligible for their respective year-end awards unless the decision was reversed, condemning the decision as being "antithetical to the principles of a free press and [setting] a dangerous precedent in a time of already heightened hostility towards journalists". On November 7, 2017, Disney reversed its decision, stating that the company "had productive discussions with the newly installed leadership at the Los Angeles Times regarding our specific concerns".

Pulitzer Prizes

Through 2014 the Times had won 41 Pulitzer Prizes, including four in editorial cartooning, and one each in spot news reporting for the 1965 Watts Riots and the 1992 Los Angeles riots.
 The Los Angeles Times received the 1984 Pulitzer Prize for Public Service for the newspaper series "Latinos".
 Times sportswriter Jim Murray won a Pulitzer in 1990.
 Times investigative reporters Chuck Philips and Michael Hiltzik won the Pulitzer in 1999 for a year-long series that exposed corruption in the music business.
 Times journalist David Willman won the 2001 Pulitzer Prize for Investigative Reporting; the organization cited "his pioneering expose of seven unsafe prescription drugs that had been approved by the Food and Drug Administration, and an analysis of the policy reforms that had reduced the agency's effectiveness." In 2004, the paper won five prizes, which is the third-most by any paper in one year (behind The New York Times in 2002 (7) and The Washington Post in 2008 (6)).
 Times reporters Bettina Boxall and Julie Cart won a Pulitzer Prize for Explanatory Reporting in 2009 "for their fresh and painstaking exploration into the cost and effectiveness of attempts to combat the growing menace of wildfires across the western United States."
 In 2011, Barbara Davidson was awarded the Pulitzer Prize for Feature Photography "for her intimate story of innocent victims trapped in the city's crossfire of deadly gang violence."
 In 2016, the Times won the breaking news Pulitzer prize for its coverage of the mass shooting in San Bernardino, California.
 In 2019, three Los Angeles Times reporters – Harriet Ryan, Matt Hamilton and Paul Pringle – won a Pulitzer Prize for their investigation into a gynecologist accused of abusing hundreds of students at the University of Southern California.

Competition and rivalry
In the 19th century, the chief competition to the Times was the Los Angeles Herald, followed by the smaller Los Angeles Tribune. In December 1903, newspaper magnate William Randolph Hearst began publishing the Los Angeles Examiner as a direct morning competitor to the Times. In the 20th century, the Los Angeles Express was an afternoon competitor, as was Manchester Boddy's Los Angeles Daily News, a Democratic newspaper.

By the mid-1940s, the Times was the leading newspaper in terms of circulation in the Los Angeles metropolitan area. In 1948, it launched the Los Angeles Mirror, an afternoon tabloid, to compete with both the Daily News and the merged Herald-Express. In 1954, the Mirror absorbed the Daily News. The combined paper, the Mirror-News, ceased publication in 1962, when the Hearst afternoon Herald-Express and the morning Los Angeles Examiner merged to become the Herald-Examiner. The Herald-Examiner published its last number in 1989. In 2014, the Los Angeles Register, published by Freedom Communications, then-parent company of the Orange County Register was launched as a daily newspaper to compete with the Times. By late September of the same year, the Los Angeles Register was folded.

Special editions

Midwinter and midsummer

Midwinter
For 69 years, from 1885 until 1954, the Times issued on New Year's Day a special annual Midwinter Number or Midwinter Edition that extolled the virtues of Southern California. At first, it was called the "Trade Number", and in 1886 it featured a special press run of "extra scope and proportions"; that is, "a twenty-four-page paper, and we hope to make it the finest exponent of this [Southern California] country that ever existed." Two years later, the edition had grown to "forty-eight handsome pages (9×15 inches), [which] stitched for convenience and better preservation", was "equivalent to a 150-page book." The last use of the phrase Trade Number was in 1895, when the edition had grown to thirty-six pages split among three separate sections.

The Midwinter Number drew acclamations from other newspapers, including this one from The Kansas City Star in 1923:

In 1948 the Midwinter Edition, as it was then called, had grown to "7 big picture magazines in beautiful rotogravure reproduction." The last mention of the Midwinter Edition was in a Times advertisement on January 10, 1954.

Midsummer
Between 1891 and 1895, the Times also issued a similar Midsummer Number, the first one with the theme "The Land and Its Fruits". Because of its issue date in September, the edition was in 1891 called the Midsummer Harvest Number.

Zoned editions and subsidiaries

In 1903, the Pacific Wireless Telegraph Company established a radiotelegraph link between the California mainland and Santa Catalina Island. In the summer of that year, the Times made use of this link to establish a local daily paper, based in Avalon, called The Wireless, which featured local news plus excerpts which had been transmitted via Morse code from the parent paper. However, this effort apparently survived for only a little more than one year.

In the 1990s, the Times published various editions catering to far-flung areas. Editions included those from the San Fernando Valley, Ventura County, Inland Empire, Orange County, San Diego County & a "National Edition" that was distributed to Washington, D.C., and the San Francisco Bay Area. The National Edition was closed in December 2004.

Some of these editions were succeeded by Our Times, a group of community supplements included in editions of the regular Los Angeles Metro newspaper.

A subsidiary, Times Community Newspapers, publishes the Daily Pilot of Newport Beach and Costa Mesa. From 2011 to 2013, the Times had published the Pasadena Sun. It also had published the Glendale News-Press and Burbank Leader from 1993 to 2020, and the La Cañada Valley Sun from 2005 to 2020.

On April 30, 2020, Charlie Plowman, publisher of Outlook Newspapers, announced he would acquire the Glendale News-Press,
Burbank Leader and La Cañada Valley Sun from Times Community Newspapers. Plowman acquired the South Pasadena Review and San Marino Tribune
in late January 2020 from the Salter family, who owned and operated these two community weeklies.

Features

One of the Times features was "Column One", a feature that appeared daily on the front page to the left-hand side. Established in September 1968, it was a place for the weird and the interesting; in the How Far Can a Piano Fly? (a compilation of Column One stories) introduction, Patt Morrison wrote that the column's purpose was to elicit a "Gee, that's interesting, I didn't know that" type of reaction.

The Times also embarked on a number of investigative journalism pieces. A series in December 2004 on the King/Drew Medical Center in Los Angeles led to a Pulitzer Prize and a more thorough coverage of the hospital's troubled history. Lopez wrote a five-part series on the civic and humanitarian disgrace of Los Angeles' Skid Row, which became the focus of a 2009 motion picture, The Soloist. It also won 62 awards at the SND awards.

From 1967 to 1972, the Times produced a Sunday supplement called West magazine. West was recognized for its art design, which was directed by Mike Salisbury (who later became art director of Rolling Stone magazine). From 2000 to 2012, the Times published the Los Angeles Times Magazine, which started as a weekly and then became a monthly supplement. The magazine focused on stories and photos of people, places, style, and other cultural affairs occurring in Los Angeles and its surrounding cities and communities. Since 2014, The California Sunday Magazine has been included in the Sunday L.A. Times edition.

Promotion

Festival of Books

In 1996, the Times started the annual Los Angeles Times Festival of Books, in association with the University of California, Los Angeles. It has panel discussions, exhibits, and stages during two days at the end of April each year. In 2011, the Festival of Books was moved to the University of Southern California.

Book prizes

Since 1980, the Times has awarded annual book prizes. The categories are now biography, current interest, fiction, first fiction, history, mystery/thriller, poetry, science and technology, and young adult fiction. In addition, the Robert Kirsch Award is presented annually to a living author with a substantial connection to the American West whose contribution to American letters deserves special recognition".

Los Angeles Times Grand Prix
From 1957 to 1987, the Times sponsored the Los Angeles Times Grand Prix that was held over at the Riverside International Raceway in Moreno Valley, California.

Other media

Book publishing 
The Times Mirror Corporation has also owned a number of book publishers over the years, including New American Library and C.V. Mosby, as well as Harry N. Abrams, Matthew Bender, and Jeppesen.

In 1960, Times Mirror of Los Angeles bought the book publisher New American Library, known for publishing affordable paperback reprints of classics and other scholarly works. The NAL continued to operate autonomously from New York and within the Mirror Company. In 1983, Odyssey Partners and Ira J. Hechler bought NAL from the Times Mirror Company for over $50 million.

In 1967, Times Mirror acquired C.V. Mosby Company, a professional publisher and merged it over the years with several other professional publishers including Resource Application, Inc., Year Book Medical Publishers, Wolfe Publishing Ltd., PSG Publishing Company, B.C. Decker, Inc., among others. Eventually in 1998 Mosby was sold to Harcourt Brace & Company to form the Elsevier Health Sciences group.

Broadcasting activities

The Times-Mirror Company was a founding owner of television station KTTV in Los Angeles, which opened in January 1949. It became that station's sole owner in 1951, after re-acquiring the minority shares it had sold to CBS in 1948. Times-Mirror also purchased a former motion picture studio, Nassour Studios, in Hollywood in 1950, which was then used to consolidate KTTV's operations. Later to be known as Metromedia Square, the studio was sold along with KTTV to Metromedia in 1963.

After a seven-year hiatus from the medium, the firm reactivated Times-Mirror Broadcasting Company with its 1970 purchase of the Dallas Times Herald and its radio and television stations, KRLD-AM-FM-TV in Dallas. The Federal Communications Commission granted an exemption of its cross-ownership policy and allowed Times-Mirror to retain the newspaper and the television outlet, which was renamed KDFW-TV.

Times-Mirror Broadcasting later acquired KTBC-TV in Austin, Texas in 1973; and in 1980 purchased a group of stations owned by Newhouse Newspapers: WAPI-TV (now WVTM-TV) in Birmingham, Alabama; KTVI in St. Louis; WSYR-TV (now WSTM-TV) in Syracuse, New York and its satellite station WSYE-TV (now WETM-TV) in Elmira, New York; and WTPA-TV (now WHTM-TV) in Harrisburg, Pennsylvania.  The company also entered the field of cable television, servicing the Phoenix and San Diego areas, amongst others. They were originally titled Times-Mirror Cable, and were later renamed to Dimension Cable Television. Similarly, they also attempted to enter the pay-TV market, with the Spotlight movie network; it wasn't successful and was quickly shut down. The cable systems were sold in the mid-1990s to Cox Communications.

Times-Mirror also pared its station group down, selling off the Syracuse, Elmira and Harrisburg properties in 1986. The remaining four outlets were packaged to a new upstart holding company, Argyle Television, in 1993. These stations were acquired by New World Communications shortly thereafter and became key components in a sweeping shift of network-station affiliations which occurred between 1994 and 1995.

Stations 

Notes:
 1 Co-owned with CBS until 1951 in a joint venture (51% owned by Times-Mirror, 49% owned by CBS);
 2 Purchased along with KRLD-AM-FM as part of Times-Mirror's acquisition of the Dallas Times Herald. Times-Mirror sold the radio stations to comply with FCC cross-ownership restrictions.

Employees

Unionization
On January 19, 2018, employees of the news department voted 248–44 in a National Labor Relations Board election to be represented by the NewsGuild-CWA. The vote came despite aggressive opposition from the paper's management team, reversing more than a century of anti-union sentiment at one of the biggest newspapers in the country.

Writers and editors

 Dean Baquet, editor 2000–2007
 Martin Baron, assistant managing editor 1979–1996
 James Bassett, reporter, editor 1934–1971
 Skip Bayless, sportswriter 1976–1978
 Barry Bearak, reporter 1982–1997
 Jim Bellows (1922–2005), editor 1967–1974
 Sheila Benson, film critic 1981–1991
 Martin Bernheimer, music critic, 1982 Pulitzer Prize for Criticism
 Bettina Boxall, reporter, 2009 Pulitzer Prize
 Jeff Brazil, reporter 1993–2000
 Harry Carr (1877–1936), reporter, columnist, editor
 John Carroll, editor 2000–2005
 Julie Cart, reporter, 2009 Pulitzer Prize
 Charles Champlin (1926–2014), film critic 1965–1980
 Sewell Chan, editor of the editorial page
 Michael Cieply, entertainment writer
 Shelby Coffey III, editor 1989–1997
 K. C. Cole, science writer
 Michael Connelly, crime reporter, novelist
 Borzou Daragahi, Beirut bureau chief
 Manohla Dargis, film critic
 Meghan Daum, columnist
 Anthony Day (1933–2007), op-ed writer, editor 1969–89
 Frank del Olmo (1948–2004), reporter, editor 1970–2004
 Al Delugach (1925–2015), reporter 1970–1989
 Barbara Demick, Beijing bureau chief, author
 Robert J. Donovan (1912–2003), Washington bureau chief
 Mike Downey, columnist 1985–2001
 Bob Drogin, national political reporter
 Roscoe Drummond (1902–1983), syndicated columnist
 E. V. Durling (1893–1957), columnist 1936–1939
 Bill Dwyre, sports editor and columnist 1981–2015
 Braven Dyer, sports reporter, sports editor 1925–1965
 Louis Dyer, reporter, editor LA Mirror, Home Magazine 1934–1955
 William J. Eaton (1930–2005), correspondent 1984–1994
 Richard Eder (1932–2014), book critic, 1987 Pulitzer Prize for Criticism
 Gordon Edes, sportswriter 1980–1989
 Helene Elliott, sports columnist
 Leonard Feather (1914–1994), jazz critic
 Dexter Filkins, foreign correspondent 1996–1999
 Nikki Finke, entertainment reporter
 Thomas Francis Ford (1873–1958), U.S. Congress member, literary and rotogravure editor, City Council member
 Douglas Frantz, managing editor 2005–2007
 Jeffrey Gettleman, Atlanta bureau chief 1999–2002
 Jonathan Gold, food writer, 2007 Pulitzer Prize
 Patrick Goldstein, film columnist 2000–2012
 Carl Greenberg (1908–1984), political writer
 Jean Guerrero, opinion columnist 
 Joyce Haber, gossip columnist 1966–1975
 Bill Henry (1890–1970), columnist 1939–1970
 Robert Hilburn, music writer 1970–2005
 Shani Olisa Hilton, deputy managing editor  
 Michael Hiltzik, investigative reporter, 1999 Pulitzer Prize for Beat Reporting
 Hedda Hopper (1885–1966), Hollywood columnist 1938–1966
 L. D. Hotchkiss (1893–1964), editor 1922–1958
 Pete Johnson, rock critic of the 1960s
 David Cay Johnston, reporter 1976–1988
 Jonathan Kaiman, Asia correspondent 2015–2016
 K. Connie Kang (1942–2019) first female Korean American journalist
 Philip P. Kerby, 1976 Pulitzer Prize for Criticism
 Ann Killion, sportswriter 1987–1988
 Grace Kingsley (1874–1962), film columnist 1914–1933
 Michael Kinsley, op-ed page editor 2004–2005
 Christopher Knight, art critic, 2020 Pulitzer Prize for Criticism
 William Knoedelseder, business writer
 Howard Lachtman, literary critic
 David Lamb (1940–2016), correspondent 1970–2004
 David Laventhol (1933–2015), publisher 1989–1994
 David Lazarus, business columnist
 Rick Loomis, photojournalist, 2007 Pulitzer Prize for Explanatory Reporting
 Stuart Loory (1937–2015), White House correspondent 1967–1971
 Steve Lopez, columnist
 Charles Fletcher Lummis (1859–1928), city editor 1884–1888
 Al Martinez (1929–2015), columnist 1984–2009
 Andres Martinez, op-ed page editor 2004–2007
 Dennis McDougal, reporter 1982–1992
 Usha Lee McFarling, reporter, 2007 Pulitzer Prize for Explanatory Reporting
 Kristine McKenna, music journalist 1977–1998
 Mary McNamara, TV critic, 2015 Pulitzer Prize for Criticism
 Doyle McManus, Washington bureau chief
 Charles McNulty, theater critic
 Alan Miller, 2003 Pulitzer Prize for National Reporting
 T. Christian Miller, investigative journalist 1999–2008
 Kay Mills, editorial writer 1978–1991
 Carolina Miranda, arts and culture critic 2014–present
 J.R. Moehringer, feature writing, 2000 Pulitzer Prize for Feature Writing
 Patt Morrison, columnist
 Suzanne Muchnic, art critic 1978–2009
 Kim Murphy, assistant managing editor for foreign and national news, 2005 Pulitzer Prize
 Jim Murray (1919–1998), sports columnist, 1990 Pulitzer Prize for Commentary
 Sonia Nazario, feature writing, 2003 Pulitzer Prize
 Dan Neil, columnist, 2004 Pulitzer Prize for Criticism
 Chuck Neubauer, investigative journalist
 Ross Newhan, baseball writer 1967–2004
 Jack Nelson (1929–2009), political reporter, 1960 Pulitzer Prize for Local Reporting
 Anne-Marie O'Connor, reporter
 Nicolai Ouroussoff, architectural critic
 Scot J. Paltrow, financial journalist 1988–1997
 Olive Percival, columnist
 Bill Plaschke, sports columnist
 Michael Parks, foreign correspondent, editor, 1987 Pulitzer Prize for International Reporting
 Russ Parsons, food writer
 Mike Penner (1957–2009) (Christine Daniels), sportswriter
 Chuck Philips, investigative reporter, 1999 Pulitzer Prize for Beat Reporting
 Michael Phillips, film critic
 Charles T. Powers, foreign correspondent, later novelist
 George Ramos (1947–2011), reporter 1978–2003
 Richard Read, reporter, 1999 Pulitzer Prize 2001 Pulitzer Prize
 Ruth Reichl, restaurant and food writer 1984–1993
 Rick Reilly, sportswriter 1983–1985
 James Risen, investigative journalist 1984–1998
 Howard Rosenberg, TV critic, 1985 Pulitzer Prize for Criticism
 Tim Rutten, columnist 1971–2011
 Harriet Ryan, Pulitzer Prize-winning investigative reporter
 Ruth Ryon (1944–2014), real estate writer 1977–2008
 Morrie Ryskind, feature writer 1960–1971
 Kevin Sack, Pulitzer Prize for National Reporting in 2003
 Ruben Salazar (1928–1970), reporter, correspondent 1959–70
 Robert Scheer, national correspondent 1976–1993
 Lee Shippey (1884–1969), columnist 1927–1949
 David Shaw (1943–2005), 1991 Pulitzer Prize for Criticism
 Gaylord Shaw, reporter, 1978 Pulitzer Prize
 Gene Sherman (1915–1969), reporter, 1960 Pulitzer Prize
 Barry Siegel, feature writing, 2002 Pulitzer Prize
 T. J. Simers, sports columnist 1990–2013
 Jack Smith (1916–1996), columnist 1953–1996
 Bob Sipchen, editorial writing, 2002 Pulitzer Prize
 Frank Sotomayor, reporter, editor
 Bill Stall (1937–2008), editorial writing, 2004 Pulitzer Prize
 Joel Stein, columnist
 Jill Stewart, reporter 1984–1991
 Rone Tempest, investigative reporter 1976–2007
 Kevin Thomas, film critic 1962–2005
 William F. Thomas (1924–2014), editor 1971–1989
 Hector Tobar, columnist, book critic
 William Tuohy (1926–2009), foreign correspondent, 1969 Pulitzer Prize for International Reporting
 Kenneth Turan, film critic
 Julia Turner, deputy managing editor 
 Peter Wallsten, national political reporter
 Matt Weinstock (1903–1970), columnist
 Kenneth R. Weiss, 2007 Pulitzer Prize for Explanatory Reporting
 Nick Williams (1906–1992), editor 1958–1971
 David Willman, 2001 Pulitzer Prize for Investigative Reporting
 Michael Wines, correspondent 1984–1988
 Jules Witcover, Washington correspondent 1970–1972
 Gene Wojciechowski, sportswriter 1986–1996
 Willard Huntington Wright (1888–1939), literary editor
 Kimi Yoshino, managing editor

Cartoonists

 Paul Francis Conrad (1924–2010), Pulitzer Prize in 1964, 1971, and 1984
 Ted Rall
 David Horsey, Pulitzer Prize in 1999 and 2003
 Frank Interlandi (1924–2010)
 Michael Patrick Ramirez, Pulitzer Prize in 1994 and 2008
 Bruce Russell (1903-1963), Pulitzer Prize in 1946

Photographers

 Don Bartletti, Pulitzer Prize in 2003
 Carolyn Cole, Pulitzer Prize in 2004
 Rick Corrales (1957–2005), photographer 1981–1995
 Mary Nogueras Frampton (1930-2006), one of the paper's first female photographers
 Jose Galvez, photographer 1980–1992
 John L. Gaunt, Jr. (1924-2007), Pulitzer Prize in 1955
 Rick Loomis, photojournalist, 2007 Pulitzer Prize
 Anacleto Rapping, multiple Pulitzer Prizes
 George Rose, photojournalist 1977–1983
 George Strock, photojournalist of the 1930s
 Annie Wells, photojournalist 1997–2008
 Clarence Williams , Pulitzer Prize in 1998

See also

 Victorian Downtown Los Angeles

References

Further reading
 
 
 
 
 
 Merrill, John C. and Harold A. Fisher. The world's great dailies: profiles of fifty newspapers (1980) pp 183–91

External links

 
 Los Angeles Times Archives (1881 to present)
 Los Angeles Times Photographic Archive ca. 1918–1990 (Charles E. Young Research Library, UCLA-Finding Aid)
 Article for the Los Angeles Beat about the Los Angeles Times guided tour
 
 Los Angeles Times Photographic Archive (UCLA Library Digital Collections)
  Los Angeles Times Photographic Archive (UCLA Library Guide)
 Image of unidentified makers of the L.A. Times "Globe", Los Angeles, 1935. Los Angeles Times Photographic Archive (Collection 1429). UCLA Library Special Collections, Charles E. Young Research Library, University of California, Los Angeles.

 
Daily newspapers published in Greater Los Angeles
Mass media in Los Angeles County, California
National newspapers published in the United States
Pulitzer Prize-winning newspapers
Publications established in 1881
1881 establishments in California
Companies that filed for Chapter 11 bankruptcy in 2008
19th century in Los Angeles
20th century in Los Angeles
21st century in Los Angeles
Pulitzer Prize for Public Service winners
Pulitzer Prize for National Reporting winners
Gerald Loeb Special Award winners